Tillie's Tomato Surprise is a 1915 screen sequel to the previous year's Tillie's Punctured Romance again starring Marie Dressler as Tillie. The film was produced by the Lubin Manufacturing Company, directed by Howell Hansel and written by Acton Davies.

The supporting cast features Colin Campbell, Eleanor Fairbanks, Sarah McVicker and Clara Lambert. Originally a six-reel movie, only one reel is known to exist and remains archived at the Library of Congress. A quasi-sequel followed two years later starring Marie Dressler as Tillie for the third time, albeit with a different last name, in Tillie Wakes Up.

External links
 Tillie's Tomato Surprise in the Internet Movie Database

1915 films
American sequel films
1915 comedy films
American silent feature films
Silent American comedy films
Films directed by Howell Hansel
Lubin Manufacturing Company films
American black-and-white films
Lost American films
1910s American films